Park Seung-a (born 16 April 1991) is a South Korean field hockey player. She competed for the South Korea women's national field hockey team at the 2016 Summer Olympics.

References

1991 births
Living people
South Korean female field hockey players
Olympic field hockey players of South Korea
Field hockey players at the 2016 Summer Olympics
People from Suwon
Field hockey players at the 2018 Asian Games
Universiade gold medalists for South Korea
Universiade medalists in field hockey
Asian Games competitors for South Korea
Medalists at the 2013 Summer Universiade
Sportspeople from Gyeonggi Province
20th-century South Korean women
21st-century South Korean women